Hellenion was an ancient Greek sanctuary in Naucratis (Egypt), founded by the cities Rhodes, Cnidus, Halicarnassus, Phaselis, Chios, Teos, Phocaea, Clazomenae and Mytilene in the reign of Amasis (6th century BC).

References

Ancient Greek archaeological sites in Egypt
Archaic Greece